{{Infobox song
| name       = Palomino
| cover      = Palomino_Cover_Art,_Gemma_Hayes.png
| alt        =
| type       = single
| artist     = Gemma Hayes
| album      = Bones+Longing
| released   = April 2015
| recorded   = 2013–2014
| studio     =
| venue      =
| genre      = Alternative
| length     =
| label      = Chasing Dragons
| writer     = Gemma Hayes
| producer   = Dave Odlum
| prev_title = 'Making My Way Back| prev_year  = 2014
| next_title = Laughter| next_year  = 2015
}}

"Palomino" is a song written by Irish singer-songwriter Gemma Hayes and the third single release from her fifth studio album Bones+Longing.

Background and release
"Palomino" was initially scheduled as the first single release from her fifth studio album Bones+Longing''. The single release was delayed to make way for "Chasing". Upon the release of the album in November 2014, Palomino featured regularly on radio in Ireland. The single appeared regularly on Newstalk, Today FM and TXFM. By spring 2015, the track was released as the second track from the LP in France, Germany and Australia among other territories. It is the third single release in Ireland. The track has featured heavily on Australian music radio station Double J.

In February 2015, Hayes released a video featuring an acoustic version of the track, the video recorded in London in 2014.

During promos in France and Germany, Hayes performed the track to coincide with the release of the album in both territories.

On 18 April "Palomino" was released on a very limited edition release to celebrate Record Store Day. The track is featured on a 7" vinyl and along with 'The Shit I Own'. Only 500 copies have been made and will be available to a number of record shops across Europe.

Popular culture
"Palomino" is used in the 2016 summer-spring advertising campaign for French fashion label Cyrillus.

Formats

7" Track listing
Side A: Palomino 
Side B: Shit I Own

Digital Release
Palomino

Music video
On 24 March 2015, during an interview with RTÉ 2fm, Hayes explained the video would be shot within the next few weeks. The music video premiered on YouTube on 2 June 2015. The music video was filmed in April and May, over a couple of weekends in East London, by Northern Irish Director Babysweet, and it shows off the projection work of Annelisa Keestra. Darcy, the Palomino, was filmed at his home in Sussex, United Kingdom. The horses appearance in Hackney Wick along with Gemma Hayes is just an illusion.

References

Gemma Hayes songs
2015 singles
2014 songs
Songs written by Gemma Hayes